San Tong is a village in Lam Tsuen, Tai Po District, the New Territories, Hong Kong.

Recognised status
San Tong is a recognised village under the New Territories Small House Policy.

See also
 Lam Tsuen San Tsuen, a village adjecent to San Tong, located to its northeast
 Ping Long, a village adjecent to San Tong, located to its southwest

References

External links
 Delineation of area of existing village San Tong (Tai Po) for election of resident representative (2019 to 2022)

Villages in Tai Po District, Hong Kong
Lam Tsuen